The heat dissipation in integrated circuits problem has gained an increasing interest in recent years due to the miniaturization of semiconductor devices. The temperature increase becomes relevant for cases of relatively small-cross-sections wires, because such temperature increase may affect the normal behavior of semiconductor devices.

Joule heating
Joule heating is a predominant heat mechanism for heat generation in integrated circuits and is an undesired effect.

Propagation

The governing equation of the physics of the problem to be analyzed is the heat diffusion equation. It relates the flux of heat in space, its variation in time and the generation of power.

Where  is the thermal conductivity,  is the density of the medium,  is the specific heat
 
Heat diffuses from the source following equation ([eq:diffusion]) and solution in a homogeneous medium of ([eq:diffusion]) has a Gaussian distribution.

See also
Thermal simulations for integrated circuits
Thermal design power
Thermal management in electronics

References

Further reading 

 

Integrated circuits
Electrical power control